"Distant Sun" is a song by Crowded House from the album Together Alone. The phrase may also refer to:
"Distant Sun", an episode from the second season of Supergirl
"Distant Sun", a song by Lacuna Coil from the album Unleashed Memories